The 1931 Cork Senior Hurling Championship was the 43rd staging of the Cork Senior Hurling Championship since its establishment by the Cork County Board in 1887. The draw for the opening round fixtures took place at the Cork Convention on 25 January 1931. The championship began on 22 March 1931 and ended on 13 December 1931.	

Blackrock were the defending champions.

On 13 December 1931, Blackrock won the championship following a 2-4 to 0-3 defeat of Éire Óg in the final. This was their 21st championship title overall and their third successive title.

Team changes

To Championship

Promoted from the Cork Intermediate Hurling Championship
 Midleton
 Passage West
 St. Anne's

Results

First round

Second round

Semi-finals

Final

Championship statistics

Miscellaneous

 On the eve of their first round game against Glen Rovers, the Honorary Secretary of the Mallow club received a telegram, allegedly from County Board Secretary Seán Óg Murphy, announcing that the game was off due to an unplayable pitch. The telegram was later revealed to be a hoax.

References

Cork Senior Hurling Championship
Cork Senior Hurling Championship